Iwanowice  is a village in Kraków County, Lesser Poland Voivodeship, in southern Poland. It is the seat of the gmina (administrative district) called Gmina Iwanowice.

The village has a population of 540.

References

Villages in Kraków County
Kielce Governorate
Kielce Voivodeship (1919–1939)